Princess Louise of Thurn and Taxis (1 June 1859 – 20 June 1948) was the eldest child of Maximilian Anton, Hereditary Prince of Thurn and Taxis and Duchess Helene in Bavaria. Louise married Prince Frederick of Hohenzollern-Sigmaringen in 1879.

Life
Louise was a member of the House of Thurn and Taxis by birth and through her marriage to Prince Frederick of Hohenzollern-Sigmaringen, a Princess of Hohenzollern-Sigmaringen.

Louise was the eldest child of Maximilian Anton, Hereditary Prince of Thurn and Taxis and his wife Duchess Helene in Bavaria.

Marriage
Louise married Prince Frederick of Hohenzollern-Sigmaringen, fifth child and youngest son of Karl Anton, Prince of Hohenzollern and his wife Princess Josephine of Baden, on 21 June 1879 in Regensburg.

Louise and Frederick did not have children.

Ancestry

References

External links
 Photograph of Princess Louise of Thurn and Taxis

1859 births
1948 deaths
Princesses of Hohenzollern-Sigmaringen
Princesses of Thurn und Taxis
German Roman Catholics
People from Heidenheim (district)